Geocoris varius is a species of big-eyed bug in the family Geocoridae, found in eastern Asia.

References

External links

 

Lygaeoidea